Joy Air is a Chinese airline launched jointly by China Eastern Airlines and AVIC I on March 29, 2008  based at Xi'an. The airline started testing service in June 2009, and commenced passenger service at the end of 2009. On December 14, 2020, Happy Airlines Co., Ltd.'s application to change the main operating base airport has been reviewed by the Civil Aviation Administration of North China and Northwest China. The current base airport will be Tianjin Binhai International Airport, and it will be changed to Xi'an Xianyang International Airport.

History 
The airline began flying on 1 June 2009 with a fleet of 3 MA-60 turboprops. This airline focuses on the northwestern part of China. The airline was testing its aircraft until the end of 2009 when it commenced passenger service with 4 MA-60 turboprops. The company is mainly owned by China Eastern Airlines, with the remaining owned by AVIC Group. China Eastern is planning to sell most of its shares in order to generate money for the company. Joy Air is expected to own 50 ACAC ARJ 21 and 50 MA-60 in 8 years.

Joy Air and Okay Airways were announced as launch customers for the Xian MA700 aircraft and are to be involved with the development of the aircraft, which is due to make its maiden flight in 2017.

Fleet 

, Joy Air fleet consists of the following aircraft:

Incidents and accidents
On 4 February 2014 Joy Air flight JR1533 from Taiyuan, China, carrying 7 crew members and 37 passengers, had a mechanical failure on the landing gear while landing at Zhengzhou. This caused landing gear to break and the aircraft's nose cone to hit the tarmac. There were no injuries.

On 10 May 2015, Joy Air flight JR1529 from Yiwu to Fuzhou with 45 passengers and 7 crew landed on Fuzhou runway 3 at about 11:57 but veered off the runway and came to a stop off the runway edge about 500 metres past the runway threshold and about 50 metres off the runway centerline with all gear on soft ground. The engines struck the ground causing the wings to be nearly torn off, and resulted in substantial damage to the fuselage and structure. 7 occupants were injured.

References

External links

Airlines of China
Airlines established in 2008
Companies based in Xi'an
Chinese brands
Chinese companies established in 2008